Telling Lies may refer to:

 Telling Lies (video game), a 2019 video game
 "Telling Lies" (song), a 1996 song by David Bowie